James Picken was an English footballer who played as a goalkeeper for South Kirkby and Doncaster Rovers.

Playing career
Picken began his football career as a junior with South Kirkby Common Road before joining South Kirkby, where he was taken on trial by Doncaster Rovers, who signed him in August 1934. In April 1935 he joined Frickley Colliery then in August 1935 he moved to Denaby United. He later returned to South Kirkby, where he played in the Yorkshire League, before re-joining local rivals Frickley on trial in February 1939 but returned to South Kirkby to end his career.

References

Year of birth missing
Date of death missing
English footballers
Association football goalkeepers
South Kirkby Colliery F.C. players
Doncaster Rovers F.C. players
Denaby United F.C. players